François Reyes (born 9 June 1954), better known as Canut Reyes, is a French guitarist of Spanish Gitano descent, singer, songwriter and painter, best known for being part of the group The Gipsy Kings.

Biography 
Canut Reyes was born in Strasbourg, the son of flamenco vocalist Jose Reyes (1928–1979) and Clementine Nésanson (deceased in 2005). Canut was part of the musical group his father and brothers started around 1974 called Jose Reyes et Los Reyes. They played their version of flamenco at private parties in the south of France. José Reyes died in 1979 after battling lung cancer.

At the end of the 1970s, the brothers joined with their Baliardo cousins, adopting the new name "Gipsy Kings", a tribute to their gypsy roots and the surname "Reyes" which means "Kings" in Spanish. The Gipsy Kings recorded their first two albums, Allegria (1982) and Luna de Fuego (1983). Despite strong support from personalities such as Brigitte Bardot and Francis Lalanne, the group was unable to break through, and Canut and Patchaï left the band.

Canut Reyes continued his musical activities in various other groups, playing mainly at private parties, and worked by day in a cement factory in Tarascon to provide for his family. In 1989 he released his first solo album Bolero, a tribute to Maurice Ravel

The Gipsy Kings had in the meantime signed a production contract with EMP. After a first eponymous album issued in 1987, they recorded Mosaic in 1989. Canut was not involved in these recordings, but he joined the group for the world tour following the release of Mosaic. Canut Reyes has been a full member of the Gipsy Kings since 1990, he participated in all of their recordings and a majority of tours around the world.

Canut met brothers Jean and Gildas Boclé in Japan in 2001, this was the beginning of a collaboration that led to the recording of Gitano, Canut Reyes' second solo album, released in 2012.

Discography

Solo 
 1989 – Bolero
 2012 – Gitano

José Reyes and Los Reyes 
 1974 – Jose Reyes & Los Reyes / Album Éponyme
 1977 – Gypsy Poet
 1978 – The Love of One Day

Los Reyes 
 1982 – Festival of Saintes Maries de la Mer
 1991 – Tribute to Jose Reyes

Celtic Tales (Boclé Brothers) 
2010 – Crossfields

See also
New Flamenco
Flamenco rumba
Gipsy Kings

References

External links 

 Canut's Personal Blog

French guitarists
French male guitarists
Flamenco guitarists
1954 births
Living people
Place of birth missing (living people)
French singer-songwriters
Gypsy jazz guitarists
Male jazz musicians
French male singer-songwriters